Reality Testing is the sixth album by English electronic musician Lone. It was released in the United Kingdom on 16 June 2014 by R&S Records.

Style
Reality Testing focuses on "dusty hip-hop grooves of auteurs like J Dilla and Madlib". A review in Pitchfork referred to the album as "Largely abandoning rave’s warp-speed tempos and sensual overload" of Galaxy Garden.

Release
The album was released on R&S Records on 16 June 2014 on vinyl record and compact disc.

Also reissued by R&S Records on 7 December 2018 as a limited edition of 300, pressed on Clear Vinyl

Reception

At Metacritic, which assigns a normalized rating out of 100 to reviews from mainstream critics, the album received an average score of 81, based on 17 reviews, indicating "universal acclaim".

Pitchfork stated that "Reality Testing is Cutler’s easiest listen—you can imagine this music playing over coffee shop speakers as much as you could put a rapper on top of it—and as such it may seem less innovative when placed up against his previous two full-lengths."

Track listing

Personnel 
 Matt Cutler – composer, producer
 Konx-om-Pax – artwork
 Noel Summerville – mastering

Charts

References

2014 albums
Lone (musician) albums
R&S Records albums